Faunis arcesilaus, the Indian faun is a butterfly found in South Asia that belongs to the Morphinae subfamily of the brush-footed butterfly family.

This butterfly may be conspecific with Faunis canens.

Distribution
The Indian faun ranges from Sikkim to Assam and Myanmar.

Description
The upperside of both the male and female is ochraceous, uniform in male. Apex of forewing and termen in forewings and hindwings in female slightly darker. Underside slightly ochraceous brown; subbasal and discal narrow dark fasciae crossing both forewing and hindwing, strongly curved on the latter; followed by a postdiscal line of minute yellow spots, six. on the forewing, seven on the hindwing, on the latter posteriorly abruptly curved; lastly, a sub terminal dark sinuous line. Antennae, head, thorax and abdomen concolorous with the upperside of the wings.

Status
In 1957, Mark Alexander Wynter-Blyth described the species as being common.

See also
List of butterflies of India
List of butterflies of India (Morphinae)
List of butterflies of India (Nymphalidae)

Cited references

References
 
 

Faunis
Butterflies of Asia